American Crystal Sugar Company is an agricultural cooperative specializing in the production of sugar and related agri-products. American Crystal is owned by nearly 2,800 shareholders who raise approximately one-third of the nation's sugarbeet acreage in the Red River valley of Minnesota and North Dakota. Additional acres are contracted in eastern Montana and western North Dakota. As the largest beet sugar producer in the United States, the company utilizes innovative farming practices, low-cost production methods, and sales and marketing leadership to produce and sell about 15 percent of America's sugar. American Crystal operates sugar factories in Crookston, East Grand Forks, and Moorhead, Minnesota; Drayton and Hillsboro, North Dakota; and Sidney, Montana, under the name Sidney Sugars Incorporated. The company's technical services center and corporate headquarters are also located in Moorhead.

Located in Bloomington, Minnesota, United Sugars Corporation markets American Crystal's sugar to retail and industrial customers throughout the nation. Midwest Agri-Commodities Company, based in San Rafael, California, globally markets American Crystal's agri-products such as sugarbeet pulp, molasses, CSB, and betaine.

History
ACS opened its Mason City, Iowa beet sugar factory in 1917 and closed it in 1973. It had come under pressure from the Iowa Water Pollution Control Commission for discharging waste into the Winnebago River and for air pollution, but it was also attributed to financial losses, a new factory at Renville, Minnesota, and fewer acres being grown.

Company imposed lockout 
In August 2011, 96% of American Crystal Sugar employees rejected a pact that would have increased wages 13% over five years (2.5% per year) but which would have demanded greater worker contributions to health insurance coverage and major contract language givebacks, including fewer seniority rights. After five votes over a 20-month period, 55% of the members of the Bakery, Confectionery, Tobacco Workers and Grain Millers' International Union Local 167G ratified a contract that closely resembled the previous four proposals. After nearly 650 employees quit over the lockout period, only about 400 reported to work following the final vote.

Political contributions and activities 
American Crystal Sugar Company was the third largest donor in America to Republican lawmakers who sought to block certification of the 2020 presidential election results, leading to the January 6, 2021 insurrection.  The first two were Koch Industries and Valero Energy.

References

Further reading

External links

American Crystal Sugar Company records at the Minnesota Historical Society

Sugar companies of the United States
Companies based in Fargo–Moorhead

Food and drink companies established in 1899
1899 establishments in Minnesota
Privately held companies based in Minnesota
American companies established in 1899